The West Indian leopard gecko (Eublepharis fuscus) is a species of leopard gecko found in western India, with its range possibly extending to southeastern Pakistan. The specific name "fuscus" means dark or dusky.

Description
It has a robust habitus and can reach  in snout–vent length.

Distribution
The gecko is widely distributed in western India: it is known from the Western Ghats (northern Karnataka and parts of Maharashtra) as well as from Gujarat. It might occur in Pakistan.

Habitat and behavior
It can be found in forested hill tracts, scrub, boulders and scrubland. It is a nocturnal, terrestrial gecko that feeds on scorpions and other arthropods.

References

 Börner, A.  R. 1981 Third contribution to the systematics of the southwest Asian lizards of the geckonid genus Eublepharis Gray 1827: Further materials from the Indian subcontinent. Saurologica, (3):1-7
 Das, I. 1997 Resolution of the systematic status of Eublepharis macularius fuscus Boerner, 1981 (EublepharidaSauria: Squamata). Hamadryad 22 (1): 13-20
 Mirza, Z. & Upadhye, R. 2010. Zur Verbreitung und Lebensweise des in Indien endemischen Lidgeckos Eublepharis fuscus Börner 1981. Sauria 32 (3): 15–23.

External links
 

Eublepharis
Reptiles of India
Endemic fauna of India
Reptiles described in 1981
Taxa named by Achim-Rüdiger Börner